Damián Darío Muñoz Galaz (born 13 January 1984) is a Chilean football manager and former player who played as a forward. He is the current manager of Curicó Unido.

Career
Born in Curicó, Muñoz played professionally for hometown side Curicó Unido, winning the Tercera División in 2005 and the Primera B in 2008, before taking over their women's youth team in 2013. In 2015, he took over the men's team, but also as a youth coach.

In June 2018, Muñoz was named interim manager after Luis Marcoleta resigned. He returned to his previous duties after the appointment of Jaime Vera, but was named assistant manager of the main squad in October 2019.

Muñoz was again interim in November 2020, after Nicolás Larcamón resigned. He was again assistant after the arrival of Martín Palermo, and returned to the interim role after Palermo resigned on 25 July 2021.

On 21 August 2021, Curicó Unido confirmed Muñoz as manager of the main squad.

Personal life
His father, Mario, deceased in 2012, was the president of Curicó Unido from 1998 to 1999.

Honours

Player
Curicó Unido
 Tercera División: 
 Primera B: 2008

References

External links

1984 births
Living people
People from Curicó
Chilean footballers
Association football forwards
Tercera División de Chile players
Primera B de Chile players
Curicó Unido footballers
Deportes Iberia footballers
Chilean football managers
Chilean Primera División managers
Curicó Unido managers